The Holy Trinity Ukrainian Greek Orthodox Church in Wilton, North Dakota was built in 1913.  It was listed on the National Register of Historic Places (NRHP) in 1982.

As of the NRHP nomination, the church no longer had regular services, as was the case for the other two historic Ukrainian Greek Orthodox churches in North Dakota.

References

Churches on the National Register of Historic Places in North Dakota
Churches completed in 1913
Ukrainian-American culture in North Dakota
1913 establishments in North Dakota
National Register of Historic Places in McLean County, North Dakota
Ukrainian Orthodox Church of the USA church buildings